Vural is a Turkish masculine name and a surname. Notable people with the name are as follows:

Given name
 Vural Arıkan (1929–1993), Turkish economist, lawyer and politician
 Vural Balcan, Turkish Olympic fencer
 Vural Öger (born 1942), German politician

Surname
 Filiz Vural (born 1953), Turkish beauty contestant 
 İhsan Emre Vural (born 1984), Turkish rower
 Yılmaz Vural (born 1953), Turkish football coach

Turkish-language surnames
Turkish masculine given names